Denjaka (abbreviation from Detasemen Jala Mangkara; Jala Mangkara Detachment) is a counter-terrorism special operations force of the Indonesian Navy. It is a combined detachment formed from selected personnel of the Navy's frogmen unit (KOPASKA) and the Marine Corps' Amphibious Reconnaissance Battalion (Taifib).

History
On 4 November 1982, the Chief of Staff of the Navy issued a decree (No. Skep/2848/XI/1982) to form a task force called  or Naval Special Forces, to fulfill the need for a maritime special operations forces capable of countering terrorism and sabotage. In the initial phase, 70 personnel from the Marine Corps Amphibious Reconnaissance Battalion and Navy frogmen were recruited to form . The unit was then based at Western Fleet Command Headquarters, Jakarta.

Upon further development of this unit, on 13 November 1984, the Chief of Staff of the Navy requested the Commander of the Indonesian National Armed Forces, General Leonardus Benjamin Moerdani, to formalize the raising of a naval special forces unit, which was approved and through the issuance of an approval letter (No. R/39/08/9/2/SPN). In 1997, after the issuance of Chief of Staff of the Navy decree No:Kep/42/VII/1997 dated 31 July that year, the formation was officially named as the Jala Mangkara Detachment.

Mission
Denjaka's primary task is to conduct anti-terrorism, anti-sabotage and other clandestine operations, maritime counter-terrorism, counter-sabotage and other special operations as directed by the chief of the armed forces. Denjaka is able to approach target by sea, underwater and vertical from the air as its qualified to be deployed as paratrooper. Aside from counter-terrorism related task, Denjaka also used to deployed for the security of VIP.

Organisational structure
According to the Indonesian Navy organization, Denjaka is a Marine Corps task force under the Indonesian Navy, with the commandant of the Marine Corps holding responsibility for general training, while specific training falls under the responsibilities of the chief of Armed Forces Strategic Intelligence Agency, such as: anti-terror, anti-sabotage and clandestine operations with marine aspect. Operational command falls directly under the chief of the armed forces. Denjaka HQ is located on Gunung Sahari street no 67 Central Jakarta.

Denjaka organization consists of one HQ team, one technical team and four operational elements, which are:
 Detachment I for counter-terrorism and counter-piracy
 Detachment II for maritime raids and intelligence gathering missions
 Detachment III for search and rescue
 Detachment IV for underwater demolition

Recruitment and training
Personnel of Denjaka are trained at Bumi Marinir Cilandak, South Jakarta and must complete four months of training called  (PTAL). Their field of operations is in the form of ships, offshore installations and coastal areas.

References

Bibliography
 

Special forces of Indonesia
Indonesian Navy
Naval special forces units and formations
Counterterrorist organizations
Military units and formations established in 1984